Abacetus usherae is a species of ground beetle in the subfamily Pterostichinae. It was described by Straneo in 1962.

References

usherae
Beetles described in 1962